George Hogan may refer to:
 George Hogan (baseball)
 George Hogan (basketball)